R-14 regional road (previously part of R-23 regional road) is a Montenegrin roadway.

History

In January 2016, the Ministry of Transport and Maritime Affairs published bylaw on categorisation of state roads. With new categorisation, R-23 regional road was split and part of it was renamed as R-14 regional road.

Major intersections

References

R-14